The Voluntary Disclosure of Income Scheme (VDIS) was a very unconventional but successful step among Indian economic policies. It would give an opportunity to the income tax or wealth tax defaulters to disclose their undisclosed income at the prevailing tax rates. This scheme would also ensure that the laws relating to economic offences would not be applicable for those defaulters. The scheme was closed on 31 December 1997. The Union Finance Minister P. Chidambaram hoped, "It is my faith that given a chance, the people of India (would) come clean of the black money."

Controversies
VDIS granted income-tax defaulters indefinite immunity from prosecution under the Foreign Exchange Regulation Act, 1973, the Income Tax Act, 1961, the Wealth Tax Act, 1957, and the Companies Act, 1956 in exchange for self-valuation and disclosure of income and assets. The Comptroller and Auditor General of India condemned the scheme in his report as abusive and a fraud on the genuine taxpayers of the country.

References

Income tax in India
Tax evasion in India
1998 in India
Gowda administration